Rollin Bert Glewwe (May 2, 1933 – April 27, 2020) was an American businessman and politician.

Glewwe was born in Saint Paul, Minnesota on May 2, 1933. He lived in South St. Paul and went to the public schools. Glewwe went to University of Minnesota. He worked for Glewwe Food Markets in South St. Paul and was the department manager and advertising director. Glewwe served on the South St. Paul City Charter Commission. Glewwe served in the Minnesota Senate from 1967 to 1973, where he represented the 12th District as a Conservative. He died in Saint Paul, Minnesota on April 27, 2020.

Notes

1933 births
2020 deaths
Businesspeople from Saint Paul, Minnesota
Politicians from Saint Paul, Minnesota
People from South St. Paul, Minnesota
University of Minnesota alumni
Minnesota state senators